Omar Correa (born 6 January 1953) is a Uruguayan former footballer. He played in one match for the Uruguay national football team in 1977. He was also part of Uruguay's squad for the 1975 Copa América tournament.

References

External links
 

1953 births
Living people
Uruguayan footballers
Uruguay international footballers
Place of birth missing (living people)
Association football goalkeepers
Club Atlético River Plate (Montevideo) players
Club Atlético River Plate footballers
Montevideo Wanderers F.C. players